The following table is a list of Mars orbiters, consisting of space probes which were launched from Earth and are currently orbiting Mars. As of February 2021, there  have been 18 spacecraft missions operating in Mars' orbit, 8 of which are currently active. In 2022, contact was lost to India's Mars Orbiter Mission.  So with that loss, 7 orbiters remain active.

History

20th century

The Soviets' Mars program and the United States's Mariner program became the two first successful space programs that intended to explore Mars through orbiters. Mars 2, Mars 3 and Mariner 9 were all launched into space in May 1971, and all entered Mars’ orbit that same year. NASA's Mariner 9 reached the planet's orbit first on November 14, narrowly beating the Soviet's spacecraft amid the space race, and subsequently became the first spacecraft to orbit another planet.

Contact with all eight Mars orbiters launched during the 20th century has been lost. NASA's four spacecraft are conjectured to remain in Mars' orbit. Mariner 9, Viking 1 and Viking 2 are expected to lower down into the Martian atmosphere by 2022 and either burn up or crash into the planet's surface. Mars Global Surveyor is expected to crash onto the surface of the planet by 2047. The fate of the Soviet's three Mars program orbiters and Phobos 2 remains unclear, but they are still presumed to be in orbit.

In 1999 the Mars Climate Orbiter impacted the Martian atmosphere.

21st century

In 2003, the European Space Agency (ESA) launched their first planetary mission with Mars Express to conduct reconnaissance and exploration of Mars from orbit. On 12 August 2005, NASA launched Mars Reconnaissance Orbiter (MRO). As MRO entered orbit in 2006, it joined three other active spacecraft which were in Mars' orbit: Mars Global Surveyor (MGS), Mars Express, and 2001 Mars Odyssey; at the time, this set a record for the most operational spacecraft in the immediate vicinity of Mars. MGS has since ceased to function.

On November 5, 2013, the Mars Orbiter Mission (Mangalyaan-1) was launched by the Indian Space Research Organisation (ISRO) as a "technology demonstrator" project. Its secondary goal is to analyze the Martian atmosphere and topography. The orbiter reached Mars orbit on September 24, 2014. Through this mission, ISRO became the first space agency to succeed in its first attempt at a Mars orbiter. The mission is the first successful Asian interplanetary mission. Ten days after ISRO's launch, NASA launched their seventh Mars orbiter MAVEN to study the Martian atmosphere. Its goals include determining how the planet's atmosphere and water, presumed to have once been substantial, were lost over time.

Fate

After achieving orbit, functional or not, Mars orbiters have been predicted to remain in orbit for a certain amount of time.

Viking 1 orbiter, likely to be in orbit until 2019 (It is likely to be still in orbit however.)
Mariner 9 is expected to remain in orbit until approximately 2022, when the spacecraft is projected to enter the Martian atmosphere and either burn up or crash into the planet's surface.
Mars Global Surveyor, around 2046 (1996+50 years)

Besides decaying to Mars, a collision with a moon or other spacecraft is also a possibility. In March 2017, MAVEN had to change its orbit to avoid colliding with Phobos, and with an increasing number of spacecraft at Mars this risk increases. The Mars Global Surveyor is still being tracked, although it is no longer functioning.

Table of objects

Note that days active category does not necessarily equate to time in orbit, for example Mars Global Surveyor is expected remain in Mars orbit for 50 years after its arrival. The detection of derelict spacecraft in Mars orbit has some interest due to the minute risk of collision with such a spacecraft.  One example of this is a  proposal to use the Optical Navigation Camera on the Mars Reconnaissance Orbiter to search for small moons, dust rings, and old orbiters.

See also

 Lists of spacecraft
 Exploration of Mars
 List of missions to Mars
 Robotic spacecraft
 Timeline of artificial satellites and space probes
 Timeline of planetary exploration

References

Missions to Mars

Space probes
Lists of spacecraft